Seneca Creek is a  tributary of the North Fork of the South Branch of the Potomac River located entirely within Pendleton County, West Virginia, USA.

Seneca Creek lies within the Appalachian Mountains, in the Spruce Knob–Seneca Rocks National Recreation Area of the Monongahela National Forest. It is formed by two spring-fed streams, Slab Camp Run and Trussel Run, on the western flanks of Spruce Mountain to the north of Spruce Knob. It empties into the North Fork of the South Branch at the community of Seneca Rocks near the base of the Seneca Rocks sandstone cliff formation.

Recreation 
Seneca Creek is popular destination for anglers, hikers, and backpackers. In 1999 it was named one of the 100 best trout streams in the United States. It holds native brook trout from the northern strain as well as wild rainbow trout.

The upper portion of the creek is paralleled by the Seneca Creek Trail, a 5-mile trail that begins at the Eastern Continental Divide on National Forest Road 112 and ends at its junction with the Horton Trail. The trail is part of the Seneca Creek Backcountry trail system, a 60-mile network of trails that extends from the Eastern Continental Divide down into the towns of Whitmer and Onego and is bounded by Gandy Creek to the west and Spruce Mountain to the east.

Tributaries 
Tributary streams are listed from south (source) to north (mouth).
Slab Camp Run
Trussel Run
Beech Run
Lower Gulf Run
Whites Run
Gulf Run
Strader Run
Horsecamp Run
Wamsley Run
McIntosh Run
Roaring Creek
Brushy Run

Communities along Seneca Creek 
Onego
Seneca Rocks
Teterton

See also
List of West Virginia rivers

References

Rivers of West Virginia
Tributaries of the Potomac River
Rivers of Pendleton County, West Virginia
Monongahela National Forest